Parliament Square is a square at the northwest end of the Palace of Westminster in the City of Westminster in central London. Laid out in the 19th century, it features a large open green area in the centre with trees to its west, and it contains twelve statues of statesmen and other notable individuals.

As well as being one of London's main tourist attractions, it is also the place where many demonstrations and protests have been held. The square is overlooked by various official buildings: legislature to the east (in the Houses of Parliament), executive offices to the north (on Whitehall), the judiciary to the west (the Supreme Court), and the church to the south (with Westminster Abbey).

Location 

Buildings looking upon the square include the churches Westminster Abbey and St Margaret's, Westminster, the Middlesex Guildhall which is the seat of the Supreme Court of the United Kingdom, Government Offices Great George Street serving HM Treasury and HM Revenue and Customs, and Portcullis House.

Roads that branch off the Parliament Square are St Margaret Street (towards Millbank), Broad Sanctuary (towards Victoria Street), Great George Street (towards Birdcage Walk), Parliament Street (leading into Whitehall) and Bridge Street (leading onto Westminster Bridge).

History 

Parliament Square was laid out in 1868 in order to open up the space around the Palace of Westminster and improve traffic flow, and featured London's first traffic signals. A substantial amount of property had to be cleared from the site. The architect responsible was Sir Charles Barry. Its original features included the Buxton Memorial Fountain, which was removed in 1949 and placed in its present position in nearby Victoria Tower Gardens in 1957. In 1950 the square was redesigned by George Grey Wornum. The central garden of the square was transferred from the Parliamentary Estate to the control of the Greater London Authority by the Greater London Authority Act 1999. It has responsibility to light, cleanse, water, pave, and repair the garden, and has powers to make bylaws for the garden.

The east side of the square, lying opposite one of the key entrances to the Palace of Westminster, has historically been a common site of protest against government action or inaction. On May Day 2000 the square was transformed into a giant allotment by a Reclaim the Streets guerrilla gardening action. Most recently, Brian Haw staged a continual protest there for several years, campaigning against British and American action in Iraq. Starting on 2 June 2001, Haw left his post only once, on 10 May 2004 – and then because he had been arrested on the charge of failing to leave the area during a security alert, and returned the following day when he was released. The disruption that Haw's protest is alleged to have caused led Parliament to insert a clause into the Serious Organised Crime and Police Act 2005 making it illegal to have protests in Parliament Square (or, indeed, in a large area reaching roughly half a mile in all directions) without first seeking the permission of the Metropolitan Police Commissioner.

The provisions of the Serious Organised Crime and Police Act relating to Parliament Square were repealed by the Police Reform and Social Responsibility Act 2011, which provides for a different regime of "prohibited activities".

As well as sparking a great deal of protest from various groups on the grounds of infringement of civil liberties including the European Convention on Human Rights, the Act was initially unsuccessful in accomplishing its goals: Brian Haw was held to be exempt from needing authorisation in a High Court ruling, as his protest had started before the Act came into effect (though any new protests would be covered); Haw remained in Parliament Square. Later, the Court of Appeal overturned this ruling, forcing Haw to apply for police authorisation to continue his protest.

Statues

The square is home to twelve statues of British, Commonwealth and foreign political figures. They are listed here in anti-clockwise order, beginning with Winston Churchill's statue, which faces Parliament.

Demonstrations
The Parliament Square Peace Campaign was a peace campaign started by Brian Haw in 2001 and carried on by Barbara Tucker until 2013.

In May 2010, a peace camp known as Democracy Village was set up on the square to protest (initially) against the British government's involvement in invasions in the Middle East, which became an eclectic movement encompassing left-wing causes and anti-globalisation protests.

The Mayor of London Boris Johnson appealed to the courts to have them removed and, after demonstrators lost an appeal in July 2010, Lord Neuberger ruled that the protesters camping on the square should be evicted. The final tents were removed in January 2012.

Panorama

References
Citations

Bibliography

Further reading
 Simon Bradley and Nikolaus Pevsner, The Buildings of England, London 6: Westminster (2003). .

External links 

Parliament Square Peace Campaign website
Specifically prohibited activities : Police Reform and Social Responsibility Act 2011. Part 3: Parliament Square Garden and surrounding area

 
1868 establishments in England
National squares
Parliament of the United Kingdom
Road junctions in London